NEC Nijmegen in European football includes the games which are played by NEC Nijmegen in competitions organised by UEFA.

Totals

Top scorers

Competitions by Countries

Results

(1961–1970)

1969-70 season

(1971–1980)

1978-79 season

(1981–1990)

1983-84 season

NEC won 2–1 on aggregate.

Barcelona won 5–2 on aggregate.

1986-87 season

(2001–2010)

2003-04 season

Wisła Kraków won 4–2 on aggregate.

2004-05 season

Cork City won 1–0 on aggregate.

2008-09 season

NEC won 1–0 on aggregate.

Hamburg won 4–0 on aggregate.

Notes

References

External links
 Official web site of NEC Nijmegen

Dutch football clubs in international competitions
NEC Nijmegen